Sir William Bodrugan (c. 1398 – 24 December 1441) was an English politician.

Family
He was the son of William Bodrugan, MP.

Career
He was a member (MP) of the Parliament of England for Cornwall in 1420, 1426, 1429, 1431, and 1433. He was also Sheriff of Cornwall and justice of the peace for Cornwall.

References

1390s births
1441 deaths
Year of birth uncertain
15th-century English politicians
English MPs 1420
English MPs 1426
English MPs 1429
English MPs 1431
English MPs 1433
High Sheriffs of Cornwall
English justices of the peace
Members of the Parliament of England (pre-1707) for Cornwall
William